Carisbrook can refer to:

 Carisbrook, Victoria, a town in Victoria, Australia
 Carisbrook stone arrangement, an Aboriginal stone arrangement near Carisbrook, Victoria
 Carisbrook railway station, a closed railway station on the Moolort railway line, Carisbrook, Victoria
 Carisbrook, Lane Cove, a heritage-listed house and local history museum at 334 Burns Bay Road, Lane Cove, New South Wales, Australia
 Carisbrook, a former sporting venue in Dunedin, New Zealand

Carisbrooke can refer to:

 Carisbrooke, a village on the south western outskirts of Newport, Isle of Wight
 Carisbrooke Castle a historic castle in Carisbrooke, Isle of Wight
 Carisbrooke College, a secondary school in Carisbrooke, Isle of Wight
 Carisbrooke railway station, a railway station situated near Carisbrooke, on the south western outskirts of Newport, Isle of Wight